The Lump is a short animated film released in 1991. It tells the story of an unattractive and unpopular man named George. One day, a lump appears on his head that looks like an attractive face. By pretending the lump is his real face, he gains fame and fortune, but soon he gets into trouble when he enters into the company of several corrupt politicians.

A National Film Board of Canada film, The Lump was written and directed by John Weldon. Harvey Atkin contributed the voice. It was nominated for the Genie Award for Best Animated Short at the 13th Genie Awards in 1992, and won the Gordon Bruce Award for Humor at the Ottawa International Animation Festival in that year.

References

External links

Watch The Lump at NFB.ca

1991 short films
Canadian animated short films
Films directed by John Weldon
National Film Board of Canada animated short films
1990s animated short films
1991 animated films
1991 films
1990s English-language films
1990s Canadian films